Last of the Summer Wine's first series originally aired on BBC1 between 4 January 1973 and 17 December 1973. All episodes from this series were written by Roy Clarke and produced and directed by James Gilbert.

The pilot episode, alternately known as "The Last of the Summer Wine" and "Of Funerals and Fish," originally premiered on the BBC's Comedy Playhouse on 4 January 1973 "The Last of the Summer Wine" was the first episode of that show's fourteenth series. The pilot received a positive enough reaction that the BBC ordered a full series of episodes, premiering on 12 November 1973.

Outline
The trio in this series consisted of:

First appearances 

Compo Simmonite (1973–2000)
Norman Clegg (1973–2010)
Cyril Blamire (1973–1975)
Sid (1973–1983)
Ivy (1973–2010)
Nora Batty (1973–2001, 2003–2008)

Episodes
Pilot

Regular Series
1Comedy Playhouse episode number.

DVD release
The first and second series were released by Universal Playback as a combined box set in September 2002. The pilot episode is not included and some episodes have been altered from their original broadcast, prompting criticism from the show's fan base, however a re-release of the box set in 2011 had the altered episodes restored to original episodes, however the pilot still was not included in the re-release. The pilot episode was released on the final boxset series 31 & 32 as an extra on disc four on 15 August 2016.

Notes

References

External links

Series 1 at the Internet Movie Database

Last of the Summer Wine series
1973 British television seasons